Clifford Howard may refer to:

Clifford Howard (writer), writer of 1916 films Purity and The Other Side of the Door
Cliff Howard (1923-2008), Canadian Olympic sailor
Clifford the dog  in Clifford the Big Red Dog book series, whose owner is given surname "Howard" in the TV series